Revl9n is a female-fronted electropop band from Sweden. Their releases include the 2006 album "Revl9n" (published by Because / Wagram Music), which includes the videos for the singles "Someone Like You", "Walking Machine" and "United" as bonus content. The single "Walking Machine" features remixes by Hot Chip and SebastiAn.

External links
  - Official MySpace site
 Official Virb site

References

Swedish musical groups